In Greek mythology, Cinyras (– Kinyras) was a famous hero and king of Cyprus. Accounts vary significantly as to his genealogy and provide a variety of stories concerning him; in many sources he is associated with the cult of Aphrodite on Cyprus, and Adonis, a consort of Aphrodite, is mentioned as his son. Some scholars have proposed a connection with the minor Ugaritic deity Kinnaru, the god of the lyre. The city Cinyreia on Cyprus was believed to have taken its name from Cinyras. According to Strabo, he had previously ruled in the city of Byblos in Phoenicia.

Biography 
The name Cinyras does not appear again until he is mentioned by Pindar as "beloved of Apollo," and the priest of Aphrodite. Pindar mentions Cinyras as being fabulously rich in Nemean Ode 8 line 18.

Later, in Greek and Roman literature and in the Christian fathers such as Clement of Alexandria, the story of Cinyras is elaborated. They say that on Cyprus, Cinyras was revered as the creator of art and of musical instruments, such as the flute. In one source, he is also noted for his physical beauty. It is believed that his name comes from the Phoenician word kinnor (Greek: κινύρα) – an eastern string instrument. It is quite possible that it was a deliberate play on words, because the legend says that Cinyras was a singer and he posed a musical challenge to Apollo and tested his abilities, for which the god Mars took his life.

If Cinyras was the Cinyra, mentioned by Pliny, who was the son of Agriopas and a Cyprian, he was credited with inventing tiles and discovering copper-mines, both of which were found in the island. He was also regarded as the inventor of tongs, the hammer, the lever, and the anvil.

Family 
According to the Bibliotheca, Cinyras was a descendant of Eos and Cephalus. His parents were Sandocus, son of Astynous (himself son of Phaethon), and Pharnace, daughter of King Megassares of Hyria. Cinyras' father, Sandocus was an immigrant from Syria who settled in Cilicia and founded a city Celenderis. Cinyras upon his arrival in Cyprus with some of his people, founded the town of Paphos and married Metharme, daughter of King Pygmalion of Cyprus. His children according to Pseudo-Apollodorus were Adonis and Oxyporos, and also daughters Braesia, Laogora and Orsedice. These maidens, by reason of the wrath of Aphrodite, cohabited with foreigners, and ended their life in Egypt. Another daughter, Laodice who married Elatus, son of Arcas, and had by him two sons Stymphalus and Pereus.

Pausanias mentions a daughter of Cinyras as the consort of Teucer, who is known to have received the kingdom of Cyprus from Belus of Tyre for having assisted him in the invasion of the island. Her name is not given in Pausanias' account, but Tzetzes writes that Teucer married Eune "daughter of Cyprus".

Stephanus of Byzantium informs us that Cinyras' mother was named Amathousa, and it was either from her or Amathous, a son of Heracles, that Amathous, the oldest city of Cyprus, received its name. Stephanus also mentions three otherwise unknown children of Cinyras: a daughter Cyprus, who had the island named after her, and two sons, Koureus and Marieus, eponyms of the towns Kourion and Marion respectively.

Hesychius says Cinyras was a son of Apollo, while Hyginus consistently calls him a son of Paphos (presumably the eponym of Paphos), and a scholiast on Pindar makes him a son of Eurymedon and the nymph Paphia. In other sources, he is the husband of Galatea. Cinyras was also called the father of Myrrha. Hesychius also mentions a daughter of Cinyras, Myrice who mourned so much she was transformed into a tamarisk tree.

Another son, Amaracus, who served as the royal perfumer of the court is mentioned by Servius.

Mythology

Trojan War 
In the earliest testimony for this character in ancient Greek literature (the account of Homer), Cinyras was a ruler on Cyprus who gave a corselet to Agamemnon as a guest-gift when he heard that the Greeks were planning to sail to Troy. Eustathius in his commentary on this passage relates that Cinyras promised assistance to Agamemnon, but did not keep his word: having promised to send fifty ships, he actually sent only one commanded by the son of Mygdalion, while the rest were sculpted from earth, with figures of men (also made of earth) imitating the crew. He was cursed by Agamemnon and subsequently punished by Apollo, who beat him in a musical contest (similar to that between Apollo and Marsyas, to see who was a better musician with a lyre) and killed him, whereupon Cinyras' fifty daughters threw themselves into the sea and were changed into sea birds (alcyones).

Myrrha 
According to Ovid, Cinyras' daughter Myrrha, impelled by an unnatural lust for her own father (in retribution for her mother Cenchreis' hubris), slept with him, became pregnant, and asked the gods to change her into something other than human; she became a tree from whose bark myrrh drips. From this incestuous union sprang the child Adonis. Cinyras was said to have committed suicide over the matter. Other authors equate Cinyras and Myrrha with king Theias of Assyria and his daughter Smyrna, and relate the same story of them. Hyginus uses the name Cinyras for the father, but Smyrna for the daughter.

Priesthood of Paphian Aphrodite 
Clement of Alexandria in his Protrepticus talks about the "Cyprian Islander Cinyras, who dared to bring forth from night to the light of day the lewd orgies of Aphrodite in his eagerness to deify a strumpet of his own country."

In his Histories, Tacitus relates the account of divination rites at the famous Temple of Venus at Paphos; according to traditional tales, this temple was founded by King Aerias, but others say Cinyras consecrated the temple, which was built right on the spot where the goddess had first stepped on the land after her birth from the sea. Here Tacitus describes him as having come to Cyprus from Cilicia, whence he introduced the worship of Paphian Aphrodite. The divination practices at the temple are said to have been introduced by Tamiras of Cilicia. The office of priesthood became hereditary in the families of both Cinyras (Cinyradae) and Tamiras, but the descendants of the latter were eventually displaced by those of the former; in the times of Tacitus, only the priest of Cinyras' line was consulted. The footnotes to this story also state that Cinyras is "Another mythical king of Cyprus. Hesychius calls him a son of Apollo, and Ovid makes him the father of Adonis."

Notes

References 
 Antoninus Liberalis, The Metamorphoses of Antoninus Liberalis translated by Francis Celoria (Routledge 1992). Online version at the Topos Text Project.
Apollodorus, The Library with an English Translation by Sir James George Frazer, F.B.A., F.R.S. in 2 Volumes, Cambridge, MA, Harvard University Press; London, William Heinemann Ltd. 1921. ISBN 0-674-99135-4. Online version at the Perseus Digital Library. Greek text available from the same website.
Gaius Julius Hyginus, Fabulae from The Myths of Hyginus translated and edited by Mary Grant. University of Kansas Publications in Humanistic Studies. Online version at the Topos Text Project.
Homer, The Iliad with an English Translation by A.T. Murray, Ph.D. in two volumes. Cambridge, MA., Harvard University Press; London, William Heinemann, Ltd. 1924. . Online version at the Perseus Digital Library.
Homer, Homeri Opera in five volumes. Oxford, Oxford University Press. 1920. . Greek text available at the Perseus Digital Library.
Maurus Servius Honoratus, In Vergilii carmina comentarii. Servii Grammatici qui feruntur in Vergilii carmina commentarii; recensuerunt Georgius Thilo et Hermannus Hagen. Georgius Thilo. Leipzig. B. G. Teubner. 1881. Online version at the Perseus Digital Library.
Nonnus of Panopolis, Dionysiaca translated by William Henry Denham Rouse (1863-1950), from the Loeb Classical Library, Cambridge, MA, Harvard University Press, 1940.  Online version at the Topos Text Project.
Nonnus of Panopolis, Dionysiaca. 3 Vols. W.H.D. Rouse. Cambridge, MA., Harvard University Press; London, William Heinemann, Ltd. 1940-1942. Greek text available at the Perseus Digital Library.
Pausanias, Description of Greece with an English Translation by W.H.S. Jones, Litt.D., and H.A. Ormerod, M.A., in 4 Volumes. Cambridge, MA, Harvard University Press; London, William Heinemann Ltd. 1918. . Online version at the Perseus Digital Library
Pausanias, Graeciae Descriptio. 3 vols. Leipzig, Teubner. 1903.  Greek text available at the Perseus Digital Library.
Pindar, Odes translated by Diane Arnson Svarlien. 1990. Online version at the Perseus Digital Library.
Pindar, The Odes of Pindar including the Principal Fragments with an Introduction and an English Translation by Sir John Sandys, Litt.D., FBA. Cambridge, MA., Harvard University Press; London, William Heinemann Ltd. 1937. Greek text available at the Perseus Digital Library.
Pindar, Odes translated by Diane Arnson Svarlien. 1990. Online version at the Perseus Digital Library.
Pindar, The Odes of Pindar including the Principal Fragments with an Introduction and an English Translation by Sir John Sandys, Litt.D., FBA. Cambridge, MA., Harvard University Press; London, William Heinemann Ltd. 1937. Greek text available at the Perseus Digital Library.
Pliny the Elder, The Natural History. John Bostock, M.D., F.R.S. H.T. Riley, Esq., B.A. London. Taylor and Francis, Red Lion Court, Fleet Street. 1855. Online version at the Perseus Digital Library.
Pliny the Elder, Naturalis Historia. Karl Friedrich Theodor Mayhoff. Lipsiae. Teubner. 1906. Latin text available at the Perseus Digital Library.
Publius Ovidius Naso, Metamorphoses translated by Brookes More (1859-1942). Boston, Cornhill Publishing Co. 1922. Online version at the Perseus Digital Library.
Publius Ovidius Naso, Metamorphoses. Hugo Magnus. Gotha (Germany). Friedr. Andr. Perthes. 1892. Latin text available at the Perseus Digital Library.
Stephanus of Byzantium, Stephani Byzantii Ethnicorum quae supersunt, edited by August Meineike (1790-1870), published 1849. A few entries from this important ancient handbook of place names have been translated by Brady Kiesling. Online version at the Topos Text Project.
William Smith. A Dictionary of Greek and Roman biography and mythology, s.v. Cinyras. London (1848).

Kings of ancient Cyprus
Kings in Greek mythology
Children of Apollo
Male lovers of Apollo
Metamorphoses characters
Suicides in Greek mythology
Mythological rape victims
Incest in Greek mythology
Cypriot mythology
Family of Adonis
Metamorphoses into birds in Greek mythology